is a park in Kitami, Setagaya, Tokyo. The total area is 38,824.83 m². Kitami Friendship Square is built over an Odakyu Railway train maintenance facility. It is adjacent to the Nogawa River and part of the Nogawa River Greenbelt. As an elevated park it can be approached on the north, west and east (river) sides either by stairs or ramps.

Facilities
There are various facilities including cherry trees, open grassy areas, a pond, fitness equipment, a children's play area, a sandpit, public washrooms and ramps providing disabled access on the east and west sides. As the park is approximately 10 metres above the railway tracks, it provides views of the Nogawa river offering the possibility of birdwatching on the east side, and of the Odakyu Odawara Line to the south, as well as more distant views of Mount Fuji and other peaks to the west and north-west.

Access
The neareast station is Kitami Station on the Odakyu Odawara Line which is 0.4 miles away (approximately 7 minutes walking distance).

History
The park was built above the Odakyu Railyard and opened in March 1997.

References

External links
https://1000enpark.com/park/00216/ (in Japanese)

Parks and gardens in Tokyo